Neville Hill may refer to
Neville Hill, area of Leeds, UK
Neville Hill depot, a train depot in Leeds, UK, also Neville Hill sidings, junction etc.
George Neville Hill, New Zealand long distance runner